Travel time reliability has been increasingly recognized as a key performance indicator for transportation roadways and transport systems, which exerts a strong influence on the stakeholders in transportation networks, including users (travelers), service providers, planners, and managers. This has stimulated research into the development of measures to quantify the level of reliability or the extent of variability in travel times. As a result, several travel time reliability measures have been introduced over the last two decades. The reliability measures can be divided into three classes: (1) point-based measures, including probability-based, moment-based, percentile-based, tail-based, and utility-based measures, (2) bound-based measures, and (3) PDF-based measures.

References

Transportation planning